The Grand Lithuanian Hetman Kristupas Radvila Perkūnas Communications and Information Systems Battalion is a Lithuanian military unit established on 8 January 2019.

History 
The Battalion was formed in January 2019, on the basis of the Communications and Information Systems Company of the Grand Duke Gediminas Staff Battalion.

Mission 
The Communications and Information Systems Battalion is responsible for the security of internal communication in the Lithuanian Armed Forces and between separate units.

According to Vice Minister of National Defence Edvinas Kerza, the establishment of the Communications and Information Systems Battalion was decided due to the need to provide protection from new IT threats.

References 

Army communications units and formations
Battalions of Lithuania
Military communications units and formations of Lithuania
Military units and formations established in 2019